1000 Roses  is a 1994 Dutch drama film directed by Theu Boermans and based on a play by Gustav Ernst. It was the openingsfilm of the Netherlands Film Festival and won the Golden Calves for Best Feature Film, Best Actress (Heebink) and Best Actor (Spijkers).

Plot
A industrial town is in turmoil after the local steel factory closes.

Cast
Marieke Heebink	... 	Gina
Jaap Spijkers	... 	Harry
Tessa Lilly Wyndham	... 	Liesje
Marianne Rogée	... 	Gina's Mother
Marisa Van Eyle	... 	Rita
Bert Geurkink	... 	Kernstock
Hannes Demming	... 	Oom / Bankdirekteur
Rik Launspach	... 	Mr. Marshall
Busso Mehring	... 	Clochard
Georg Bühren	... 	Bankemployee
Michiel Mentens	... 	Mijnheer Offermans
Camilla Mercier	... 	Oude vrouw
Jean Vercoutere	... 	Fabrieksdirekteur
Clement Franz	... 	Burgemeester
Christian Deuson	... 	Politie commissaris

External links

References

Dutch drama films
1994 films
1990s Dutch-language films
Films shot in the Netherlands